Chrosna may refer to the following places in Poland:
Chrośna, Kuyavian-Pomeranian Voivodeship
Chrosna, Lesser Poland Voivodeship
Chrosna, Masovian Voivodeship